Nick Wrenn born in the United Kingdom  is a former journalist and former Vice President of digital services for CNN International. Nick Wrenn is working at Facebook as a Head of News Programs for Europe Middle East & Africa.

Career 
Wrenn started his career in 1990 as a newspaper reporter in England for Southern Newspapers. From 1996 to 1997 he worked for United Press International as a freelance reporter. In 1997 he started working for Reuters as a freelance reporter. He joined the BBC in 1997 till 2000 as an Assistant Director, he was a member of the team that launched and grew the BBC News website. 

Wrenn joined CNN in 2003 as a Managing Editor. In 2008 to 2014 he was appointed as a Vice President of CNN International Digital Services. He then joined Facebook in 2014 and as of 2020 is Head of News Partnerships program for EMEA.

References 

Living people
British investigative journalists
CNN people
Year of birth missing (living people)